Sibaya is a hamlet in the Altiplano of northern Chile. As of 2017 Sibaya had 46 inhabitants and 123 homes. It has an irrigation system based on underground aqueducts tapping an aquifer.

The hamlet was badly hit by the 2005 Tarapacá earthquake. The Church of Sibaya is listed as a National Monument within the category of Historical Monument since January 27, 2009. After its reconstruction the church was reopened on September 5, 2015.

References

Oases of Chile
Populated places in El Tamarugal Province
Localities irrigated by puquios